Worship of the Gods is the second full-length album by Argentine pagan metal, folk metal band Tersivel. The album was released on October 27, 2017. The album refers to Julian, also known as Julian the Apostate, who was Roman Emperor from 361 to 363. He purged the top-heavy state bureaucracy and attempted to revive traditional Roman religious practices at the expense of Christianity.

Track listing

Personnel
Tersivel
Lian Gerbino – vocals, electric guitar, acoustic guitar
Franco Robert – keyboards, piano, accordion, backing vocals
Camilo Torrado – bass, backing vocals
Andrés Gualco – drums, percussion
Additional musicians and production
Lucas Gerbino – darbuka on tracks 1 & 7
Fabricio Faccioli – growls on track 3
Lian Gerbino – sound engineer, audio mixing, mastering

References

2017 albums
Julian (emperor)
Tersivel albums